The Smell of Our Own is a 2003 album by The Hidden Cameras.

Track listing
 "Golden Streams"  – 4:28
 "Ban Marriage"  – 4:15
 "A Miracle"  – 2:50
 "The Animals of Prey"  – 4:04
 "Smells Like Happiness"  – 3:08
 "Day Is Dawning"  – 5:06
 "Boys of Melody"  – 4:59
 "Shame"  – 5:28
 "Breathe on It"  – 2:52
 "The Man That I Am with My Man"  – 4:37

Bonus tracks on Japanese edition
 "Heavy Flow of Evil" – 2:55
 "The Dying Galatian" – 2:22

Personnel
Joel Gibb – producer, mixing, artwork, vocals, guitars, bass, piano, pipe organ, glockenspiel, vibraphone, sleigh bells, cymbals, marimba, timpani, tambourine, clapping
Gunter Kravis – photography
Graham Hollings – saxophone
Andy Magoffin – producer, mixing, trumpet, clapping
Magali Meagher – drums
Kristen Moss – harp
Mike Olsen – cello
Owen Pallett – violin, viola
Matias Rozenberg – timpanis, cymbals, drums, bass, bass synth keys, mandolin, trombone, vibraphone
Justin Stayshyn – Hammond organ, pipe organ, piano
Bob Wiseman – piano
Choir: Karen Azoulay, October Brown, Linda Bush, Janis Demkiw, Mike e.b., Liz Forsberg, Brenda Goldstein, Paige Gratland, Graham Hollings, Luis Jacob, G.B. Jones, Samara Liu, Judy MacDonald, Maggie MacDonald, Magali Meagher, Mez,  Roy Mitchell, Jenny Orenda,  Paul P., Owen Pallett,  Kristy Simpson, Justin Stashyn, Karen Turner, Lex Vaughn, Reg Vermue

References

External links 
Review of The Smell of Our Own in The Guardian

2003 albums
The Hidden Cameras albums
Rough Trade Records albums